Elizabeth Hendrickson (born July 3, 1979) is an American actress. Her big break came when she was cast as character Frankie Stone on the daytime drama All My Children. Her equally popular role of Maggie Stone, the character's identical twin, launched the character into iconic status as one half of supercouple Bianca Montgomery and Maggie Stone.

Following her departure from All My Children, Hendrickson guest starred in several primetime shows. Since 2008, she starred as fashion vixen Chloe Mitchell on The Young and the Restless.

Early life
Hendrickson was born in New York City. Her family later moved to Northport, Long Island, and maintained a home there. At an early age, Hendrickson showed an interest in the performing arts. "Artistic people have always surrounded me," she stated in a Q&A interview, citing her actor/artist family as her inspiration for wanting to become an actress. "Their talent and love for the arts continue to inspire me and always will." Her cousin is documentary filmmaker Dennis Michael Lynch. By the age of 5, Hendrickson was tap dancing on tabletops at family weddings. As she aged, her love for performing deepened. 

Hendrickson studied musical theatre at Syracuse University for two years before returning to New York. She transferred to Fordham College in her sophomore year.

She auditioned for the roles of Bianca Montgomery, Rain Wilkins and Pine Valley High cheerleader Mindy on the daytime drama All My Children, but others were cast in the parts. She tried out as Guiding Light character Michelle Bauer Santos, a role that eventually went to actress Rebecca Budig.

Career

All My Children
In 2001, when All My Children head writer Richard Culliton wanted to set up a murder storyline, he created character Mary Frances Stone (referred to onscreen as "Frankie"). Hendrickson was cast in the part. Her character was set to be the lesbian girlfriend of Bianca Montgomery (Eden Riegel) and be killed in 3 months.
It was deemed unlikely that a homosexual pairing on a soap opera would be successful, but fan reaction to the Bianca and Frankie pairing was unprecedented. Unfortunately, the Culliton murder storyline could not be rewritten, so Frankie was killed and Bianca's mother, Erica Kane (Susan Lucci), was seen standing over her corpse holding a gun.

This prompted uproar in the soap opera community, and producers quickly thought up a way to bring the actress back to the show. Rather than rewrite Frankie's murder, the writers created her identical twin sister, Mary Margaret Stone (better known as Maggie), in 2002. Maggie quickly became instrumental in solving her sister's murder.

Storyline tension was created when it was revealed that unlike Frankie, character Maggie was not gay. This, however, did not stop Bianca and Maggie (fondly referred to in soap circles as BAM) fans from becoming very vocal about their support for the couple. After several heterosexual pairings involving Maggie did not work on the show, the writers began to develop a deepening relationship between the two characters. Eventually, Maggie kissed Bianca, moments before Bianca's lover, Lena Kundera (Olga Sosnovska), walked in.

Bianca and Maggie became one of the most demanded couples in soap opera history. Hendrickson subsequently gained a loyal lesbian following. In 2006, Lesbianation.com, self-proclaimed as the leading online community for lesbians, voted her on their top ten list of Women We Love. The following year, Hendrickson again made the list.

Hendrickson portrayed the popular role of Maggie until February 2005. Onscreen, Maggie exited Pine Valley with Bianca, traveling with her and her daughter, Miranda, to live in Paris. In late 2005, during Bianca's visit to Pine Valley, it was revealed that Maggie and Bianca had become lovers offscreen. In real life, Hendrickson and former castmate Eden Riegel have since separately moved to Los Angeles, and are pursuing other acting ventures. Riegel, however, did return to All My Children for a year, as part of a major storyline in late 2006, early 2007. Hendrickson returned again in January 2007 for a short 3-week stint. Her last airdate was February 7, 2007 when her character returned to Paris.

Other roles
Since leaving All My Children, Hendrickson has earned guest starring roles in the television shows Medium, Cold Case, CSI: Miami and an uncredited role in Criminal Minds. She was to guest star on an episode of Criminal Minds titled Doubt on April 25, 2007, in the role of Katie, but the episode was pulled in deference to the tragedy at Virginia Tech and similar subject matter. The episode became the Season 3 premiere instead.

Hendrickson signed on to play the role of Chloe Mitchell, a fashionista who stirs up trouble on the daytime drama The Young and the Restless in early 2008. It was revealed on the August 29, 2008 episode that the character was actually Kate, daughter of Katherine Chancellor's maid, Esther Valentine. Hendrickson exited the program in May 2014, but made guest appearances in October 2014 and October 2015. In May 2016 it was announced that Hendrickson would be returning to The Young and the Restless. She appeared from July 2016 to July 2017. She returned again in June 2019, and has remained on the series on a recurring status.

Hendrickson has starred in the web series Imaginary Bitches with Riegel. In May 2018, it was announced that Hendrickson had joined the cast of General Hospital as Margaux Dawson. However, she left the show the following year in order to return to her role on The Young and the Restless.

Personal life
Her best friend is interior designer and television personality Jeremiah Brent

Hendrickson married Rob Meder on June 29, 2019, after becoming engaged in December 2018. The couple have one daughter, born on March 27, 2020. Hendrickson's pregnancy was written into her character's storyline on The Young and the Restless.

Filmography

Awards and nominations

References

External links

Elizabeth Hendrickson in Bud Light Commercial
Elizabeth Hendrickson in Ford Fusion Commercial
Imaginary Bitches Web Series

1979 births
Living people
American television actresses
American soap opera actresses
Actresses from New York (state)
People from Northport, New York
21st-century American actresses